Svatební cesta do Jiljí  is a Czech television romantic comedy film. It was directed by Hynek Bočan and released in 1983. It stars a real life couple Josef Abrhám and Libuše Šafránková.

Production
The film was shot in summer 1982 in Krkonoše mountains.

Cast
Josef Abrhám as Tomáš Krchňák
Libuše Šafránková as Petra
Josef Větrovec as Tomáš's father
Blažena Holišová as Tomáš's mother
Ladislav Smoljak as Lost & Found Office clerk
Zdeněk Svěrák as Train attendant
Karel Augusta as Meadow owner
Jiří Kodet as Radovan, recreation facility owner
Jan Skopeček as Train dispatcher in Ústí
Václav Vydra nejml. as Railwayman in Ústí
Vlastimil Bedrna as Postman

References

External links
 

1983 films
Czechoslovak comedy films
1983 comedy films
Czech comedy films
1980s Czech films